Thomas Cleland Dawson (July 30, 1865 – May 1, 1912) was a career United States diplomat.

Biography
Born in Hudson, Wisconsin, Dawson received his bachelor's degree from Hanover College and his law degree from University of Cincinnati College of Law. He also studied at Harvard University. Dawson practiced law in Des Moines, Iowa and Council Bluffs, Iowa and was an assistant Iowa Attorney General. He was also a newspaper publisher. Dawson entered the diplomatic service in 1891, when he was appointed Secretary of Legation in Brazil. He was U.S. minister and consul general to the Dominican Republic (1904‑1907), during which term he negotiated the American-Dominican Fiscal Convention of 1907; then ambassador to Colombia (1907‑1909), Chile (1909), and Panama (1910). He is the author of The South American Republics (2 vols., 1903 and 1904).

References

External links
 
 
 

1865 births
1912 deaths
Hanover College alumni
University of Cincinnati College of Law alumni
Harvard University alumni
Iowa lawyers
Writers from Iowa
Writers from Wisconsin
People from Hudson, Wisconsin
Ambassadors of the United States to the Dominican Republic
Ambassadors of the United States to Colombia
Ambassadors of the United States to Chile
Ambassadors of the United States to Panama
19th-century American lawyers